As a nickname Fish or The Fish may refer to:

 James Averis (born 1974), English retired cricketer
 Lord William Cecil (bishop) (1863–1936), English Anglican bishop and eccentric
 Ben Fisher (born 1981), Australian rugby league footballer and coach
 Philip Fisher, former drummer and original member of Fishbone (formed 1979), an American alternative rock band
 Steve Fisher (snowboarder) (born 1982), American snowboarder nicknamed "The Fish"
 Tyler Fisher (born 1993), South African rugby union player
 Jon Fishman (born 1965), drummer in the American jam band Phish
 Felicia Hano (born 1998), American artistic gymnast and former trampolinist
 Robert "Fish" Jones (died 1930), American businessman and showman
 Barry Melton (born 1947), guitarist and co-founder of the band Country Joe and The Fish, nicknamed "The Fish"
 Herman Salmon (1913–1980), American barnstormer, air racer and test pilot
 Chris Squire (1948-2015), bassist in the British progressive rock band Yes
 Richard Stannard (triathlete) (born 1974), British triathlete nicknamed "The Fish"
 Derek William Dick (born 1958), former lead singer of the band Marillion, popularly known as "Fish"

See also 

Derek Fisher (born 1974), American National Basketball Association player nicknamed "D-Fish"
Benny Bass (1904–1975), American world champion boxer nicknamed "Little Fish"

References

Lists of people by nickname